Charltona cervinellus is a moth in the family Crambidae. It was described by Frederic Moore in 1872. It is found in India.

References

Crambinae
Moths described in 1872
Taxa named by Frederic Moore